The 1996 British Columbia general election was the 36th provincial election in the Province of British Columbia, Canada. It was held to elect members of the Legislative Assembly of British Columbia. The election was called on April 30, 1996, and held on May 28, 1996. Voter turnout was 59.1 per cent of all eligible voters.  The election is notable for producing a "false-winner" outcome, rewarding a party that got second in the popular vote with a majority government.

New Democratic Party leader and provincial premier Mike Harcourt had resigned as the result of a fundraising scandal involving one of the members of his caucus. Glen Clark was chosen by the party to replace Harcourt. Clark led the party to a second majority government, defeating the Liberal Party of Gordon Campbell, who had become leader of the Liberal Party after Gordon Wilson had been forced out of the position because of his relationship with another Liberal member of the legislature, Judi Tyabji.

After Wilson was defeated by Campbell in the convention to choose a new leader, he and Tyabji left the Liberal Party to establish the Progressive Democratic Alliance. Wilson was able to win re-election, but Tyabji was not, who went down to defeat with all of the other candidates fielded by the new party.

The once-dominant Social Credit Party collapsed. It elected Grace McCarthy as its leader in 1993, but she was unable to make a bid to get into the legislature until 1994, when she lost a by-election in the longtime Socred stronghold of Matsqui. Soon afterward, four of its remaining six members defected to Reform BC, leaving Social Credit without official status in the legislature. One more seat was lost in a by-election, reducing the party's one representation to one MLA, Cliff Serwa. However, Serwa retired before the election, leaving the party with no incumbents. Party leader Larry Gillanders withdrew from the race while the campaign was in progress, saying that all right-wing parties should unite to topple the ruling NDP.  The Socreds won only 0.4% of the vote and were completely shut out of the legislature. While the party still nominally exists, it has never elected another MLA and even lost its registration from 2013 to 2016.
 
Reform BC held on to two of its four seats.

Although the Liberals won a larger share of the popular vote, most of their votes were wasted in the outer regions of the province, and it won only 8 seats in the Vancouver area. That allowed the NDP to win 6 more seats than the opposition Liberals, eking out a majority government. This was the last election to return an NDP majority until 2020, 24 years later.

Results

Notes:

* Party did not nominate candidates in the previous election.

Results by riding

|-
| style="background:whitesmoke;"|Abbotsford
| ||Bruce Temple5,405 - 24.69%
|| |||John van Dongen10,998 - 50.24%
| ||Mark Warawa4,086 - 18.67%
| ||Merilyn Anderson1,125 - 5.14%
| ||Geoff Berner274 - 1.25%
| ||
|| |||John van Dongen
|-
| style="background:whitesmoke;"|Alberni
|| |||Gerard A. M. Janssen7,398 - 52.01%
| ||Gillian Trumper5,099 - 35.85%
| ||Vi Hiansen823 - 5.79%
| ||Ingrid Helen Rebar578 - 4.06%
| ||Andre Sperling195 - 1.37%
| ||
|| |||Gerard A. M. Janssen
|-
| style="background:whitesmoke;"|Bulkley Valley-Stikine
|| |||Bill Goodacre4,779 - 37.02%
| ||Pat Beach3,726 - 28.87%
| ||Bill Zemenchik3,473 - 26.91%
| ||Sharon L. Hartwell624 - 4.83%
| ||Stuart Hertzog151 - 1.17%
| ||Peter Barendregt (SC)155 - 1.20%
|| |||Jackie Pement
|-
| style="background:whitesmoke;"|Burnaby-Edmonds
|| |||Fred Randall9,912 - 46.45%
| ||Judy St. Denis8,770 - 41.09%
| ||Carlos Brito1,008 - 4.72%
| ||John Schwermer1,067 - 5.00%
| ||Eric Hawthorne387 - 1.81%
| ||
|| |||Fred Randall
|-
| style="background:whitesmoke;"|Burnaby North
|| |||Pietro Calendino8,926 - 45.47%
| ||Richard T. Lee8,160 - 41.57%
| ||Daniela Bosa1,081 - 5.51%
| ||Richard A. Y. Lee976 - 4.97%
| ||Tom Hetherington395 - 2.01%
| ||
|| |||Barry Jones
|-
| style="background:whitesmoke;"|Burnaby-Willingdon
|| |||Joan Sawicki10,501 - 45.54%
| ||John Nuraney9,678 - 41.97%
| ||Sunny G. Sodhi999 - 4.33%
| ||Thomas Reekie1,161 - 5.03%
| ||Joe Keithley458 - 1.99%
| ||
|| |||Joan Sawicki
|-
| style="background:whitesmoke;"|Cariboo North
| ||Frank Garden5,180 - 38.26%
|| |||John D. Wilson5,533 - 40.87%
| ||Robert Eyford2,561 - 18.92%
| ||
| ||Phillip Mencero168 - 1.24%
| ||Ric Steines (Ltn.)97 - 0.72%
|| |||Frank Garden
|-
| style="background:whitesmoke;"|Cariboo South
|| |||David Zirnhelt6,372 - 41.45%
| ||Dave Worthy6,050 - 39.35%
| ||Jon Wolbers2,684 - 17.46%
| ||
| ||Donald Stuart Rennie267 - 1.74%
| ||
|| |||David Zirnhelt
|-
| style="background:whitesmoke;"|Chilliwack
| ||Rollie Keith5,989 - 24.48%
|| |||Barry Penner9,273 - 37.90%
| ||Bill Wimpney3,237 - 13.23%
| ||
| ||Steve Kisbey232 - 0.95%
| ||Bob Chisholm5,736 - 23.44%
| ||Bob Chisholm
|-
| style="background:whitesmoke;"|Columbia River-Revelstoke
|| |||Jim Doyle6,264 - 42.52%
| ||Brian Allan McMahon5,172 - 35.10%
| ||Steve V. Pinchak2,687 - 18.24%
| ||Dave Herman282 - 1.91%
| ||Rhonda Smith270 - 1.83%
| ||Sonia Stairs (NLP)58 - 0.39%
|| |||Jim Doyle
|-
| style="background:whitesmoke;"|Comox Valley
|| |||Evelyn Gillespie13,230 - 42.76%
| ||Bill MacDonald10,721 - 34.65%
| ||Delbert Doll3,451 - 11.15%
| ||Joe Lawlor1,039 - 3.36%
| ||Meaghan Cursons1,296 - 4.19%
| ||
|| |||Margaret Lord
|-
| style="background:whitesmoke;"|Coquitlam-Maillardville
|| |||John Cashore10,812 - 45.91%
| ||Maxine Wilson9,440 - 40.08%
| ||Bev Walsh1,434 - 6.09%
| ||Angela Broughton1,289 - 5.47%
| ||
| ||
|| |||John Cashore
|-
| style="background:whitesmoke;"|Cowichan-Ladysmith
|| |||Jan Pullinger12,249 - 49.85%
| ||Ray Smith7,783 - 31.68%
| ||Tom Walker2,434 - 9.91%
| ||Perry James Johnson1,459 - 5.94%
| ||Julian West645 - 2.63%
| ||
|| |||Jan Pullinger
|-
| style="background:whitesmoke;"|Delta North
| ||Norm Lortie8,657 - 42.33%
|| |||Reni Masi9,305 - 45.50%
| ||Gurmant Grewal755 - 3.69%
| ||Ross Pike1,385 - 6.77%
| ||Angela Chiotakos347 - 1.70%
| ||
|| |||Norm Lortie
|-
| style="background:whitesmoke;"|Delta South
| ||Lloyd MacDonald5,984 - 26.22%
|| |||Fred Gingell13,415 - 58.78%
| ||Kevin Garvey1,371 - 6.01%
| ||Donna M. Tobias1,215 - 5.32%
| ||Greg Dickey333 - 1.46%
| ||
|| |||Fred Gingell
|-
| style="background:whitesmoke;"|Esquimalt-Metchosin
|| |||Moe Sihota13,833 - 59.54%
| ||Heather Landon6,770 - 29.14%
| ||Scotty Davidson1,179 - 5.07%
| ||Ron Whims921 - 3.96%
| ||Adam Charlesworth376 - 1.62%
| ||
|| |||Moe Sihota
|-
| style="background:whitesmoke;"|Fort Langley-Aldergrove
| ||Charles Bradford7,369 - 29.03%
|| |||Rich Coleman12,005 - 47.30%
| ||John Twidale3,484 - 13.73%
| ||Bob Farquhar1,737 - 6.84%
| ||Amy Salmon472 - 1.86%
| ||Lila O. Stanford (FCP)316 - 1.24%
|| |||Gary Farrell-Collins
|-
| style="background:whitesmoke;"|Kamloops
|| |||Cathy McGregor10,135 - 44.30%
| ||Gur Singh9,273 - 40.53%
| ||Joe Leong1,721 - 7.52%
| ||Deborah J. Fisher1,241 - 5.42%
| ||
| ||Ken Endean (SC)508 - 2.22%
|| |||Arthur L. Charbonneau
|-
| style="background:whitesmoke;"|Kamloops-North Thompson
| ||Fred Jackson6,945 - 41.25%
|| |||Kevin Krueger7,313 - 43.43%
| ||Alan Forseth1,710 - 10.16%
| ||
| ||Alan Child401 - 2.38%
| ||Steve Quinn (SC)468 - 2.78%
|| |||Fred Jackson
|-
| style="background:whitesmoke;"|Kootenay
|| |||Erda Walsh6,398 - 38.59%
| ||Ron Tarr5,887 - 35.50%
| ||Wilf Hanni3,718 - 22.42%
| ||
| ||Casey Brennan363 - 2.19%
| ||Marko Makar215 - 1.30%
|| |||Anne Edwards
|-
| style="background:whitesmoke;"|Langley
| ||Kim Richter5,795 - 29.12%
|| |||Lynn Stephens9,277 - 46.62%
| ||Joe Lopushinsky3,224 - 16.20%
| ||Paul MacDonald1,195 - 6.00%
| ||Fely Gotia-Walters262 - 1.32%
| ||Ian B. Thompson (SC)148 - 0.74%
|| |||Lynn Stephens
|-
| style="background:whitesmoke;"|Malahat-Juan de Fuca
|| |||Rick Kasper10,686-48.63%
| ||Mike Elcock7,556 - 34.39%
| ||Bill Cools1,887 - 8.59%
| ||Donna Launay1,061 - 4.83%
| ||Beverley Holden601 - 2.74%
| ||
|| |||Rick Kasper
|-
| style="background:whitesmoke;"|Maple Ridge-Pitt Meadows
|| |||Bill Hartley12,946 - 46.07%
| ||Ken Stewart10,960 - 39.00%
| ||Nick Walsh1,470 - 5.23%
| ||Peter Neufeld2,011 - 7.16%
| ||Richard Hennick464 - 1.65%
| ||
|| |||Bill Hartley
|-
| style="background:whitesmoke;"|Matsqui
| ||Deb Charrois5,349 - 24.93%
|| |||Michael de Jong10,903 - 50.81%
| ||Simon Gibson4,405 - 20.53%
| ||
| ||Sam Wager216 - 1.01%
| ||
|| |||Peter A. Dueck
|-
| style="background:whitesmoke;"|Mission-Kent
|| |||Dennis Streifel8,232 - 44.16%
| ||Abe Neufeld7,112 - 38.15%
| ||Frank Sleigh1,618 - 8.68%
| ||Heather Sebastian1,243 - 6.67%
| ||Hans Grages324 - 1.74%
| ||Chum Richardson113 - 0.61%
|| |||Dennis Streifel
|-
| style="background:whitesmoke;"|Nanaimo
|| |||Dale Lovick11,210 - 48.75%
| ||Gary Richard Korpan7,672 - 33.36%
| ||Garry D. Shepp1,867 - 8.12%
| ||David J. Weston1,337 - 5.81%
| ||Karen M. Shillington486 - 2.11%
| ||
|| |||Dale Lovick
|-
| style="background:whitesmoke;"|Nelson-Creston
|| |||Corky Evans9,179 - 44.90%
| ||Howard Dirks6,434 - 31.47%
| ||Brian Dale Gaschnitz2,114 - 10.34%
| ||
| ||Andy Shadrack2,282 - 11.16%
| ||
|| |||Corky Evans
|-
| style="background:whitesmoke;"|New Westminster
|| |||Graeme Bowbrick10,418 - 46.69%
| ||Helen Sparkes8,591 - 38.50%
| ||Brian Stromgren1,446 - 6.48%
| ||Craig Sahlin1,121 - 5.02%
| ||Michael G. Horn488 - 2.19%
| ||
|| |||Anita Hagen
|-
| style="background:whitesmoke;"|North Coast
|| |||Dan Miller7,298 - 64.82%
| ||Odd Eidsvik2,899 - 25.75%
| ||Clarence Hall830 - 7.37%
| ||
| ||Patrick Lemaire232 - 2.06%
| ||
|| |||Dan Miller
|-
| style="background:whitesmoke;"|North Island
|| |||Glenn Robertson8,385 - 45.80%
| ||Gerry Furney6,781 - 37.04%
| ||Dave Jackson1,776 - 9.70%
| ||Mark Grenier887 - 4.84%
| ||Don Malcolm479 - 2.62%
| ||
|| |||Colin S. Gabelmann
|-
| style="background:whitesmoke;"|North Vancouver-Lonsdale
| ||David Schreck7,151 - 35.56%
|| |||Katherine Whittred9,325 - 46.37%
| ||Stanley Dzuba1,241 - 6.17%
| ||Royston Forsyth1,736 - 8.63%
| ||Renee Chalut417 - 2.07%
| ||
|| |||David Schreck
|-
| style="background:whitesmoke;"|North Vancouver-Seymour
| ||Michelle Kemper6,676 - 26.56%
|| |||Daniel Jarvis14,165 - 56.35%
| ||Caroline Meredith1,737 - 6.91%
| ||David Massey1,713 - 6.81%
| ||Mark Brooks645 - 2.57%
| ||
|| |||Daniel Jarvis
|-
| style="background:whitesmoke;"|Oak Bay-Gordon Head
| ||Elizabeth Cull11,700 - 44.17%
|| |||Ida Chong12,340 - 46.59%
| ||Paul Yewchuk675 - 2.55%
| ||Gordon Henderson937 - 3.54%
| ||Lenora Burke566 - 2.14%
| ||
|| |||Elizabeth Cull
|-
| style="background:whitesmoke;"|Okanagan-Boundary
| ||Bill Barlee6,984 - 38.20%
|| |||Bill Barisoff7,011 - 38.35%
| ||Garry Mitchell2,810 - 15.37%
| ||Kevin Highfield775 - 4.24%
| ||David Simm356 - 1.95%
| ||
|| |||Bill Barlee
|-
| style="background:whitesmoke;"|Okanagan East
| ||Janet Elizabeth Gooch5,176 - 21.17%
|| |||John Weisbeck9,382 - 38.37%
| ||Stamata Andrich3,116 - 12.74%
| ||Judi Tyabji6,432 - 26.30%
| ||Dave Cursons347 - 1.42%
| ||
|| |||Judi Tyabji
|-
| style="background:whitesmoke;"|Okanagan-Penticton
| ||Jim Beattie9,092 - 36.74%
|| |||Rick Thorpe10,661 - 43.07%
| ||Loretta Krauter2,976 - 12.02%
| ||Johannes L. Thoen1,444 - 5.83%
| ||Harry Philip Naegel464 - 1.87%
| ||Carol Ross (NLP)113 - 0.46%
|| |||Jim Beattie
|-
| style="background:whitesmoke;"|Okanagan-Vernon
| ||Howard Brown7,497 - 29.95%
|| |||April Sanders9,776 - 39.06%
| ||Heinz Weiss5,356 - 21.40%
| ||Geoff Jell1,839 - 7.35%
| ||Jane Peach3,34 - 1.33%
| ||Clinton Henry (SC)227 - 0.91%
|| |||Lyall Hanson
|-
| style="background:whitesmoke;"|Okanagan West
| ||Ken Charlish8,281 - 24.46%
|| |||Sindi Hawkins15,575 - 46.00%
| ||Keith Thompson4,858 - 14.35%
| ||Angie March4,225 - 12.48%
| ||Damon Klein519 - 1.53%
| ||George Lensen (SC)399 - 1.18%
|| |||Clifford Jack Serwa
|-
| style="background:whitesmoke;"|Parksville-Qualicum
| ||Leonard Krog12,976 - 39.72%
|| |||Paul Reitsma13,459 - 41.19%
| ||Teunis Westbroek3,955 - 12.11%
| ||Garner Stone1,669 - 5.11%
| ||Mark Robinson422 - 1.29%
| ||
|| |||Leonard Krog
|-
| style="background:whitesmoke;"|Peace River North
| ||Brian Churchill1,975 - 18.04%
| ||Ben Knutson3,137 - 28.66%
|| |||Richard Neufeld5,299 - 48.41%
| ||Neil Bitterman169 - 1.54%
| ||
| ||
|| |||Richard Neufeld
|-
| style="background:whitesmoke;"|Peace River South
| ||Patrick Michiel3,778 - 30.88%
| ||Brian Haddow3,774 - 30.85%
|| |||Jack Weisgerber3,901 - 31.89%
| ||Wade Alexander Allan183 - 1.50%
| ||Shane Hartnell145 - 1.19%
| ||Aime Girard (SC)452 - 3.69%
|| |||Jack Weisgerber
|-
| style="background:whitesmoke;"|Port Coquitlam
|| |||Mike Farnworth14,767 - 46.37%
| ||Irene Barr13,310 - 41.80%
| ||Lawrence Glazer1,335 - 4.19%
| ||Rick Howard1,789 - 5.62%
| ||Debra Eilers417 - 1.31%
| ||
|| |||Mike Farnworth
|-
| style="background:whitesmoke;"|Port Moody-Burnaby Mountain
| ||Jamie Ross9,804 - 42.69%
|| |||Christy Clark10,272 - 44.73%
| ||Diane Friesen1,039 - 4.52%
| ||Margaret Connor1,408 - 6.13%
| ||Oz Catt441 - 1.92%
| ||
|| |||Barbara E. Copping
|-
| style="background:whitesmoke;"|Powell River-Sunshine Coast
| ||Bill Forst6,088 - 27.57%
| ||Cameron Reid3,911 - 17.71%
| ||Don Atkinson677 - 3.07%
|| |||Gordon Wilson10,833 - 49.05%
| ||D. Wendy Young518 - 2.35%
| ||Roslyn Griston (Common Sense)57 - 0.26%
|| |||Gordon Wilson
|-
| style="background:whitesmoke;"|Prince George-Mount Robson
|| |||Lois Boone4,713 - 40.67%
| ||Lorne Dittmar3,764 - 32.48%
| ||Norm Lorenz2,076 - 17.92%
| ||Brian Self788 - 6.80%
| ||Richard Michael Zammuto247 - 2.13%
| ||
|| |||Lois Boone
|-
| style="background:whitesmoke;"|Prince George North
|| |||Paul Ramsey5,837 - 39.58%
| ||Bob Viergever4,923 - 33.38%
| ||Ron Hirvi2,430 - 16.48%
| ||Adele Graber891 - 6.04%
| ||Carolyn Linden173 - 1.17%
| ||Ken Benham495 - 3.36%
|| |||Paul Ramsey
|-
| style="background:whitesmoke;"|Prince George-Omineca
| ||Chuck Fraser5,206 - 34.82%
|| |||Paul Nettleton5,514 - 36.88%
| ||Ron Ray2,998 - 20.05%
| ||Carole Fraser1,023 - 6.84%
| ||Todd Edward Romaine209 - 1.40%
| ||
|| |||Len Fox
|-
| style="background:whitesmoke;"|Richmond Centre
| ||Doug Black5,723 - 32.02%
|| |||Doug Symons9,925 - 55.52%
| ||Shamim Akbar614 - 3.43%
| ||Rob Oey996 - 5.57%
| ||Manoa Friedson235 - 1.31%
| ||
|| |||Doug Symons
|-
| style="background:whitesmoke;"|Richmond East
| ||Balwant Sanghera5,763 - 31.40%
|| |||Linda Reid10,205 - 55.60%
| ||Paula Peterson792 - 4.32%
| ||Marc G. Schaper1,093 - 5.96%
| ||Kevan Eric Hudson235 - 1.28%
| ||
|| |||Linda Reid
|-
| style="background:whitesmoke;"|Richmond-Steveston
| ||Gail Paquette5,041 - 29.61%
|| |||Geoff Plant9,643 - 56.65%
| ||Shirley Abraham-Kirk556 - 3.27%
| ||Pat Young919 - 5.40%
| ||Brian Gold188 - 1.10%
| ||
|| |||Allan Warnke
|-
| style="background:whitesmoke;"|Rossland-Trail
|| |||Ed Conroy8,635 - 50.74%
| ||Jim Greene5,923 - 34.80%
| ||Phillip Morris1,366 - 8.03%
| ||Kathy Plummer660 - 3.88%
| ||Clare Greidanus434 - 2.55%
| ||
|| |||Ed Conroy
|-
| style="background:whitesmoke;"|Saanich North and the Islands
| ||Lynda Laushway10,546 - 37.51%
|| |||Murray Robert Coell13,374 - 47.57%
| ||Ross Imrie1,627 - 5.79%
| ||Gary Lundy1,533 - 5.45%
| ||Wally du Temple898 - 3.19%
| ||
|| |||Clive Tanner
|-
| style="background:whitesmoke;"|Saanich South
|| |||Andrew Petter11,394 - 46.11%
| ||Frank Leonard10,867 - 43.98%
| ||Colin Knecht676 - 2.74%
| ||Cherie Dealey1,198 - 4.85%
| ||Jack Etkin343 - 1.39%
| ||
|| |||Andrew Petter
|-
| style="background:whitesmoke;"|Shuswap
| ||Calvin White7,869 - 31.63%
|| |||George Abbott8,596 - 34.55%
| ||Colin Mayes5,617 - 22.58%
| ||Bev Torrens1,325 - 5.33%
| ||Paul Stephen De Felice237 - 0.95%
| ||
|| |||Shannon O'Neill
|-
| style="background:whitesmoke;"|Skeena
|| |||Helmut Giesbrecht5,353 - 40.34%
| ||Rick Wozney4,718 - 35.56%
| ||Andy Burton2,744 - 20.68%
| ||
| ||Doug Bodnar205 - 1.54%
| ||Dave Serry (SC)249 - 1.88%
|| |||Helmut Giesbrecht
|-
| style="background:whitesmoke;"|Surrey-Cloverdale
| ||Charan Gill8,831 - 29.82%
|| |||Bonnie McKinnon14,297 - 48.27%
| ||Stuart Clark2,690 - 9.08%
| ||Philip McCormack2,417 - 8.16%
| ||David Walters366 - 1.24%
| ||
|| |||Ken Jones
|-
| style="background:whitesmoke;"|Surrey-Green Timbers
|| |||Sue Hammell10,278 - 50.11%
| ||Bill Phelps6,930 - 33.79%
| ||Dominic Darmanin1,183 - 5.77%
| ||Gerard Baisch1,150 - 5.61%
| ||Romeo De La Pena228 - 1.11%
| ||
|| |||Sue Hammell
|-
| style="background:whitesmoke;"|Surrey-Newton
|| |||Penny Priddy13,969 - 49.54%
| ||Indra Thind9,788 - 34.71%
| ||Liaqat Bajwa1,244 - 4.41%
| ||Ian Brown1,841 - 6.53%
| ||Maureen A. MacDonald340 - 1.21%
| ||
|| |||Penny Priddy
|-
| style="background:whitesmoke;"|Surrey-Whalley
|| |||Joan Smallwood7,396 - 50.14%
| ||Judy Higginbotham4,576 - 31.02%
| ||John Conway1,302 - 8.83%
| ||Vlad Marjanovic968 - 6.56%
| ||Jens M. Haeusser243 - 1.65%
| ||
|| |||Joan Smallwood
|-
| style="background:whitesmoke;"|Surrey-White Rock
| ||David Thompson8,215 - 26.43%
|| |||Wilf Hurd18,039 - 58.04%
| ||David Secord2,519 - 8.10%
| ||Ahmad Bajwa1,110 - 3.57%
| ||Steve Chitty677 - 2.18%
| ||
|| |||Wilf Hurd
|-
| style="background:whitesmoke;"|Vancouver-Burrard
|| |||Tim Stevenson10,646 - 49.70%
| ||Duncan Wilson7,975 - 37.23%
| ||Aletta Buday671 - 3.13%
| ||Laura McDiarmid1,014 - 4.73%
| ||Imtiaz Popat563 - 2.63%
| ||
|| |||Emery O. Barnes
|-
| style="background:whitesmoke;"|Vancouver-Fraserview
|| |||Ian Waddell8,774 - 45.97%
| ||Gulzar Cheema8,394 - 43.98%
| ||Tim Shreeve643 - 3.37%
| ||Andy Wong815 - 4.27%
| ||Stephen Samuel225 - 1.18%
| ||
|| |||Bernie Simpson
|-
| style="background:whitesmoke;"|Vancouver-Hastings
|| |||Joy MacPhail9,894 - 54.01%
| ||Raymond Leung6,345 - 34.64%
| ||Nazario Matino568 - 3.10%
| ||Joe Cafariello824 - 4.50%
| ||Irene L. Schmidt486 - 2.65%
| ||
|| |||Joy MacPhail
|-
| style="background:whitesmoke;"|Vancouver-Kensington
|| |||Ujjal Dosanjh9,496 - 50.74%
| ||Gim Huey7,608 - 40.65%
| ||Kirk Pankey472 - 2.52%
| ||Don Seykens537 - 2.87%
| ||Kelly White349 - 1.86%
| ||
|| |||Ujjal Dosanjh
|-
| style="background:whitesmoke;"|Vancouver-Kingsway
|| |||Glen Clark10,525 - 55.46%
| ||Francis Ho6,997 - 36.87%
| ||Graham Norton367 - 1.93%
| ||Julia Marks518 - 2.73%
| ||Marilyn Hogan264 - 1.39%
| ||
|| |||Glen Clark
|-
| style="background:whitesmoke;"|Vancouver-Langara
| ||Ragini Rankin5,515 - 30.08%
|| |||Val J. Anderson11,038 - 60.20%
| ||Christie Jung519 - 2.83%
| ||Philip Read839 - 4.58%
| ||Michael Airton337 - 1.84%
| ||Jerry Zen-Jih Chang (NLP)89 - 0.49%
|| |||Val J. Anderson
|-
| style="background:whitesmoke;"|Vancouver-Little Mountain
| ||Margaret Birrell9,390 - 39.20%
|| |||Gary Farrell-Collins12,036 - 50.25%
| ||David J. Waine489 - 2.04%
| ||Ted Philip Badley1,062 - 4.43%
| ||Stuart Parker714 - 2.98%
| ||
|| |||Tom Perry
|-
| style="background:whitesmoke;"|Vancouver-Mount Pleasant
|| |||Jenny W. C. Kwan11,155 - 64.05%
| ||Anne Beer4,243 - 24.36%
| ||Wayne Marsden354 - 2.03%
| ||John Spark584 - 3.35%
| ||Paul Alexander759 - 4.36%
| ||
|| |||Mike Harcourt
|-
| style="background:whitesmoke;"|Vancouver-Point Grey
| ||Jim Green11,074 - 42.81%
|| |||Gordon Campbell12,637 - 48.86%
| ||Sager Jan406 - 1.57%
| ||Allison Mountstevens857 - 3.31%
| ||Ralph Maud683 - 2.64%
| ||
|| |||Darlene R. Marzari
|-
| style="background:whitesmoke;"|Vancouver-Quilchena
| ||Roger Boshier4,977 - 22.04%
|| |||Colin Hansen15,509 - 68.68%
| ||Jay Davison495 - 2.19%
| ||Richard Chave Sanderson827 - 3.66%
| ||Valerie Jerome627 - 2.78%
| ||
|| |||Art Cowie
|-
| style="background:whitesmoke;"|Victoria-Beacon Hill
|| |||Gretchen Brewin11,960 - 52.51%
| ||Howard Markson7,636 - 33.52%
| ||Ken Conrad654 - 2.87%
| ||Richard Fahl1,093 - 4.80%
| ||Stephen DeMeulenaere1,008 - 4.43%
| ||
|| |||Gretchen Brewin
|-
| style="background:whitesmoke;"|Victoria-Hillside
|| |||Steve Orcherton11,585 - 53.32%
| ||Sheila Orr6,862 - 31.58%
| ||Dan Willson979 - 4.51%
| ||Gary Beyer1,227 - 5.65%
| ||David Scott White790 - 3.64%
| ||
|| |||Robin Blencoe
|-
| style="background:whitesmoke;"|West Vancouver-Capilano
| ||Daniel Reeve3,486 - 14.90%
|| |||Jeremy Dalton16,675 - 71.29%
| ||Ted Shandro1,326 - 5.67%
| ||Marina Jurlina1,182 - 5.05%
| ||Matthew Ferguson461 - 1.97%
| ||
|| |||Jeremy Dalton
|-
| style="background:whitesmoke;"|West Vancouver-Garibaldi
| ||Brenda Broughton6,288 - 29.16%
|| |||Ted Nebbeling12,326 - 57.17%
| ||Jim Mercier1,430 - 6.63%
| ||Roland T. French693 - 3.21%
| ||Peggy Stortz532 - 2.47%
| ||
| ||David J. Mitchell
|-
| style="background:whitesmoke;"|Yale-Lillooet
|| |||Harry Lali7,081 - 41.06%
| ||Jim Rabbitt5,912 - 34.29%
| ||John Calvin Stinson3,419 - 19.83%
| ||Richard Bennett706 - 4.09%
| ||
| ||Ed Vanwoudenberg (FCP)124 - 0.72%
|| |||Harry Lali
|-

See also
List of political parties in British Columbia

References

Further reading

External links
Elections BC 1996 Election
Losing the vote, winning the election, CBC video

1996
1996 elections in Canada
1996 in British Columbia
May 1996 events in Canada